Siddan ( – fairy mound) is a civil parish in  County Meath, Ireland.

The parish formerly formed one of the gateways that made up the border of the Pale.

References

Civil parishes of County Meath